Oscar Martín may refer to:

 Oscar Martín (footballer, born 1934), Argentine footballer
 Óscar Martín (footballer, born 1988), Spanish footballer